Jijona or Xixona is a town and municipality in the Valencian Community on the eastern coast of Spain.

Turrón
The town is famous for a type of soft nougat, known in Spanish as Turrón de Jijona and in Valencian as Torró de Xixona. This is mostly due to the extensive almond farming that has existed since the Moorish farmers originally cultivated the almond trees following the Islamic conquest of the Iberian Peninsula. Several factories produce turrón, which is all distributed for sale in December, although now they are trying to expand it during the other months.

This turrón is protected by European Union, through the IGP (Indicación Geográfica Protegida).

Municipalities in the Province of Alicante